This List of largest houses in the Los Angeles metropolitan area includes 13 single-family residences that are known to equal or exceed  of livable space within the main house. The official square footage of the largest houses in Los Angeles and the Los Angeles metropolitan area excludes ancillary buildings such as guest quarters and pool houses.

Proximity
Eleven of the 12 houses lie within the Platinum Triangle, including three in Holmby Hills and four in Beverly Hills. Another four of these houses are situated in Bel Air within a  radius.

Largest houses by floor space

See also 
 List of largest houses in the United States
 List of Gilded Age mansions

References 

Houses, United States, Los Angeles

Houses
Buildings and structures in Los Angeles